Kadampur is the north west part of Budhanur panchayat, Chengannur Taluk, Alappuzha District, in state of Kerala, India.

Villages in Alappuzha district
Places in Alappuzha district